The Minister for Integration (Swedish: Integrationsminister) was a cabinet minister within the Swedish Government between 1996 and 2014. The cabinet minister was appointed by the Prime Minister of Sweden.

The minister was responsible for issues regarding integration, discrimination, human rights at the national level, Swedish citizenship and minorities. The last Minister for Integration was Erik Ullenhag, who served from 2010 to 2014.

When the Andersson Cabinet took office in November 2021, the minister post was re-established. It was placed at the Ministry of Justice, and combined with Minister of Migration. Since October 2022, the position is placed at the Ministry for Employment and the current minister is Johan Pehrson of the Liberals.

List of Ministers for Integration 

|}

Ministry history 
The office of Minister for Integration was under several different ministries from its founding in 1996 to its abolishment in 2014. The offie was re-established in 2021.

Government ministers of Sweden